Dancing with the Stars is a New Zealand television dance contest based on the British series Strictly Come Dancing. The show introduces New Zealand celebrities paired with professional ballroom dancers who each week compete against each other in a competition to impress a panel of judges and the viewing public in order to survive potential elimination. Through a telephone poll, viewers vote for those couples who should stay. The public vote and the average score given by the panel of judges equally go towards deciding who should leave. Proceeds from the voting go to the celebrity contestant's charity of choice.

History
Dancing with the Stars has been popular with the New Zealand public. The first series, which aired in 2005, was the highest rated timeslot programme, averaged 730,000 people per episode, while the second series had an average of 804,000. Up to a million people tuned into each of the series finales. The third series premiered in 2007 with 735,000 viewers, the fourth series premiered in 2008 with 720,000 viewers, and the fifth series premiered with over 800,000 viewers, the highest of all previous series debuts.

From 20052009, the show was hosted by television personality Jason Gunn and co-hosted by professional dancer Candy Lane. All music was performed live by the Dancing with the Stars band, led by musical director Carl Doy. For the 2015 series, the show was hosted by Dominic Bowden and co-hosted by radio personality Sharyn Casey.

TVNZ announced in November 2009 that the show would not be returning in 2010, due to the economic climate. In November 2013, television production house Great Southern Television announced that it had acquired the New Zealand rights to the show and would be pitching a new series to all broadcasters. In March 2015, it was announced that Dancing with the Stars had been picked up by TV3 for a sixth series, which began airing in May 2015. In December 2017, it was that announced that a seventh series would air, this began in April 2018. In November 2018, it was announced that the eighth series would air, beginning in April 2019.

In December 2019, it was that announced that a ninth series would air on Three in 2020. On 11 February 2020, the show announced that former contestant Laura Daniel would be replacing Rachel White on the judging panel for the ninth series. On 23 February 2020, The New Zealand Herald reported that Destiny Church Pastor and Vision NZ leader Hannah Tamaki was tipped to join the series. After major backlash online, MediaWorks confirmed that Tamaki would no longer be joining the series. In the same statement, they confirmed that the cast announcement for the ninth series is scheduled for the end of March 2020. However, due to the COVID-19 pandemic in New Zealand, the series has been postponed indefinitely. In March 2022 it was confirmed that the show will return later that year. In April it was announced that judges Julz Tocker and Rachel White would be replaced by James Luck and Lance Savali.

Judging panel

Professional dancers and their partners

Key:
 Winner of the series
 (2nd)
 (3rd)
 (4th)
 First elimination of the series
 Withdrew from the series
 Participating in current series

Series overview

List of dances
The following are a list of dances that contestants and their partners have performed in an episode:

In the sixth series, the Argentine Tango and Salsa were also performed. In the seventh series, the Charleston and Reggaeton were also performed. The Hip hop and Contemporary made their debut in eighth series.

References

External links

 
2005 New Zealand television series debuts
2000s New Zealand television series
2010s New Zealand television series
2020s New Zealand television series
Dance competition television shows
English-language television shows
New Zealand reality television series
New Zealand music television series
Three (TV channel) original programming
TVNZ 1 original programming
New Zealand television series based on British television series